This is a list of law enforcement agencies in the state of Michigan.

According to the US Bureau of Justice Statistics' 2008 Census of State and Local Law Enforcement Agencies, the state had 571 law enforcement agencies employing 19,009 sworn police officers, about 190 for each 100,000 residents.

State agencies 
 Michigan Department of Corrections
 Michigan Department of Natural Resources
 Michigan Conservation Officers
 Michigan State Police

Regional agencies 

 Central Michigan Enforcement Team  CMAT 

 Flint Area Narcotics Group FANG 

 Huron Undercover Narcotics Team  HUNT 

 Livingston and Washtenaw Narcotics Enforcement Team LAWNET 

 Metropolitan Enforcement Team MET 

 Straits Area Narcotics Enforcement  SANE  

 State, Sheriffs, Chiefs Enforcement Team SSCENT  

 Strike Team Investigative Narcotics Group STING  

 Southwest Enforcement Team  SWET 

 Traverse Narcotics Team TNT 

 Thumb Narcotics Unit TNU 

 Tri County Metro Narcotics Tri-County 

 Upper Peninsula Substance Enforcement Team  UPSET 

 West Michigan Enforcement Team WEMET

County agencies 

 Alcona County Sheriff's Office
 Alger County Sheriff's Office
 Allegan County Sheriff's Office
 Alpena County Sheriff's Office
 Antrim County Sheriff's Office
 Arenac County Sheriff's Office
 Baraga County Sheriff's Office
 Barry County Sheriff's Office
 Bay County Sheriff's Office
 Benzie County Sheriff's Office
 Berrien County Sheriff's Office
 Branch County Sheriff's Office
 Calhoun County Sheriff's Office
 Cass County Sheriff's Office
 Charlevoix County Sheriff's Office
 Cheboygan County Sheriff's Office
 Chippewa County Sheriff's Office
 Clare County Sheriff's Office
 Clinton County Sheriff's Office
 Crawford County Sheriff's Office
 Delta County Sheriff's Office
 Dickinson County Sheriff's Office
 Eaton County Sheriff's Office
 Emmet County Sheriff's Office
 Genesee County Sheriff's Office
 Gladwin County Sheriff's Office
 Gogebic County Sheriff's Office
 Grand Traverse County Sheriff's Office
 Gratiot County Sheriff's Office
 Hillsdale County Sheriff's Office
 Houghton County Sheriff's Office
 Huron County Sheriff's Office
 Ingham County Sheriff's Office
 Ionia County Sheriff's Office
 Iosco County Sheriff's Office
 Iron County Sheriff's Office
 Isabella County Sheriff's Office
 Jackson County Sheriff's Office
 Kalamazoo County Sheriff's Office
 Kalkaska County Sheriff's Office
 Kent County Sheriff's Office
 Keweenaw County Sheriff's Office

 Lake County Sheriff's Office
 Lapeer County Sheriff's Office
 Leelanau County Sheriff's Office
 Lenawee County Sheriff's Office
 Livingston County Sheriff's Office
 Luce County Sheriff's Office
 Mackinac County Sheriff's Office
 Macomb County Sheriff's Office
 Manistee County Sheriff's Office
 Marquette County Sheriff's Office
 Mason County Sheriff's Office
 Mecosta County Sheriff's Office
 Menominee County Sheriff's Office
 Midland County Sheriff's Office
 Missaukee County Sheriff's Office
 Monroe County Sheriff's Office
 Montcalm County Sheriff's Office
 Montmorency County Sheriff's Office
 Muskegon County Sheriff's Office
 Newaygo County Sheriff's Office
 Oakland County Sheriff's Office
 Oceana County Sheriff's Office
 Ogemaw County Sheriff's Office
 Ontonagon County Sheriff's Office
 Osceola County Sheriff's Office
 Oscoda County Sheriff's Office
 Otsego County Sheriff's Office
 Ottawa County Sheriff's Office
 Presque Isle County Sheriff's Office
 Roscommon County Sheriff's Office
 Saginaw County Sheriff's Office
 Saint Clair County Sheriff's Office
 Saint Joseph County Sheriff's Office
 Sanilac County Sheriff's Office
 Schoolcraft County Sheriff's Office
 Shiawassee County Sheriff's Office
 Tuscola County Sheriff's Office
 Van Buren County Sheriff's Office
 Washtenaw County Sheriff's Office
 Wayne County Sheriff's Office
 Wexford County Sheriff's Office

Municipal agencies 

 Adrian Police Department
 Akron Police Department
Albion Department of Public Safety
 Allegan Police Department
 Allen Park Police Department
 Alma Department of Public Safety
 Almont Police Department
 Alpena Police Department
 Ann Arbor Police Department
 Armada Police Department
Au Gres Police Department
 Auburn Hills Police Department
 Augusta Police Department
 Bad Axe Police Department
 Bancroft Police Department
 Bangor Police Department
 Baraga Police Department
Barryton Police Department
 Battle Creek Police Department
 Bay City Department of Public Safety
Beaverton Police Department
Belding Police Department
 Bellaire Police Department
 Belleville Police Department
 Bellevue Police Department
 Benton Harbor Police Department
 Berkley Department of Public Safety
 Beverly Hills Department of Public Safety
 Big Rapids Department of Public Safety
 Birch Run Police Department
 Birmingham Police Department
 Blissfield Police Department
Bloomfield Hills Department of Public Safety
 Boyne City Police Department
Breckenridge Police Department
Bridgeman Police Department
 Bridgeport Police Department
 Brighton Police Department
 Bronson Police Department
 Brown City Police Department
 Buchanan Police Department
 Burton Police Department
 Cadillac Police Department
 Carleton Police Department
 Caro Police Department
 Carson City Police Department
 Caseville Police Department
 Caspian Police Department
Cass City Police Department
 Cassopolis Police Department
 Center Line Department of Public Safety
 Central Lake Police Department
 Charlevoix Police Department
 Charlotte Police Department
 Cheboygan Department of Public Safety
 Chelsea Police Department
Chesaning Police Department
 Clare Police Department
 Clawson Police Department
 Clinton Police Department
 Clio Police Department
 Coldwater Police Department
 Coleman Police Department
 Colon Police Department
 Constantine Police Department
 Corunna Police Department
 Croswell Police Department
 Crystal Falls Police Department
 Davison Police Department
 Dearborn Heights Police Department
 Dearborn Police Department
 Decatur Police Department
 Deckerville Police Department
 Detroit Police Department
 DeWitt Police Department
 Douglas Police Department
 Dowagiac Police Department
 Dundee Police Department
 Durand Police Department
 East Grand Rapids Department of Public Safety
 East Jordan Police Department
 East Lansing Police Department
 East Tawas Police Department
 Eastpointe Police Department
 Eaton Rapids Police Department
 Eau Claire Police Department
 Ecorse Police Department
 Elk Rapids Police Department
 Elkton Police Department
Ellsworth Police Department
 Elsie Police Department
 Escanaba Department of Public Safety
 Essexville Department of Public Safety
 Evart Police Department
 Farmington Department of Public Safety
 Farmington Hills Police Department
Fennville Police Department
 Fenton Police Department
 Ferndale Police Department
 Flat Rock Police Department
 Flint Police Department
 Flushing Police Department
 Fowlerville Police Department
 Frankenmuth Police Department
 Frankfort Police Department
Franklin Police Department
Fraser Department of Public Safety
Freeport Police Department
 Fremont Police Department
Gagetown Police Department
 Galien Police Department (Michigan) Galien Police Department
 Garden City Police Department
 Gaylord Police Department
 Gibraltar Police Department
Gladstone Department of Public Safety
 Gladwin Police Department
Grand Beach-Michiana Police Department
Grand Blanc Police Department
Grand Haven Department of Public Safety
Grand Ledge Police Department
Grand Rapids Police Department
Grandville Police Department
Grant Police Department
Grayling Police Department
Greenville Department of Public Safety
Grosse Pointe Department of Public Safety
Grosse Pointe Farms Department of Public Safety
Grosse Pointe Park Department of Public Safety
Grosse Pointe Shores Department of Public Safety
Grosse Pointe Woods Police Department
 Hamtramck Police Department
 Hancock Police Department
 Harbor Beach Police Department
 Harbor Springs Police Department
 Harper Woods Police Department
 Hart Police Department
 Hartford Police Department
 Hastings Police Department
 Hazel Park Police Department
 Hesperia Police Department
 Highland Park Department of Public Safety
 Hillsdale Police Department
 Holland Department of Public Safety
 Holly Police Department
 Houghton Police Department
 Howard City Police Department
 Howell Police Department
 Hudson Police Department
 Huntington Woods Department of Public Safety
 Imlay City Police Department
 Inkster Police Department
 Ionia Department of Public Safety
 Iron Mountain Police Department
 Iron River Police Department
 Ironwood Department of Public Safety
 Ishpeming Police Department
 Jackson Police Department
 Jonesville Police Department
 Kalamazoo Department of Public Safety
 Kalkaska Department of Public Safety
 Keego Harbor Police Department
 Kentwood Police Department
Kinde Police Department
Kingsford Department of Public Safety
Kingston Police Department
L’Anse Police Department
 Laingsburg Police Department
Lake Angelus Police Department
 Lake Linden Police Department
 Lake Odessa Police Department
 Lake Orion Police Department
Lakeview Police Department

 Lansing Police Department
 Lapeer Police Department
 Lathrup Village Police Department
 Laurium Police Department
Lawrence Police Department
 Lawton Police Department
 Lennon Police Department
 Leslie Police Department
 Lexington Police Department
 Lincoln Park Police Department
 Linden Police Department
 Litchfield Police Department
 Livonia Police Department
 Lowell Police Department
 Ludington Police Department
 Luna Pier Police Department
 Mackinac Island Police Department
 Mackinaw City Police Department
 Madison Heights Police Department
 Mancelona Police Department
 Manistee Police Department
Manistique Department of Public Safety
 Manton Police Department
 Marine City Police Department
 Marlette Police Department
 Marquette Police Department
 Marshall Police Department
 Marysville Police Department
 Mason Police Department
 Mattawan Police Department
 Mayville Police Department
 Melvindale Police Department
 Memphis Police Department
 Mendon Police Department
Menominee Police Department
 Midland Police Department
 Milan Police Department
 Milford Police Department
 Millington Police Department
Minden City Police Department
 Monroe Police Department
 Montague Police Department
 Morenci Police Department
Morley Police Department
 Morrice Police Department
 Mount Morris Police Department
 Mount Pleasant Police Department
 Munising Police Department
 Muskegon Heights Police Department
 Muskegon Police Department
 Nashville Police Department
 Negaunee Police Department
 New Baltimore Police Department
 New Buffalo Police Department
New Era Police Department
 New Lothrop Police Department
 Newaygo Police Department
 Niles Police Department
 North Muskegon Police Department
Northville Police Department
 Norton Shores Police Department
 Norway Police Department
 Novi Police Department
 Oak Park Department of Public Safety
Oakley Police Department
 Olivet Police Department
 Orchard Lake Police Department
 Otisville Police Department
 Otsego Police Department
 Ovid Police Department
 Owendale Police Department
 Owosso Police Department
 Oxford Police Department
 Paw Paw Police Department
 Peck Police Department
 Pentwater Police Department
 Perry Police Department
 Petoskey Department of Public Safety
 Pigeon Police Department
 Pinckney Police Department
 Pinconning Police Department
 Plainwell Department of Public Safety
 Pleasant Ridge Police Department
 Plymouth Police Department
 Port Austin Police Department
 Port Huron Police Department
 Portage Police Department
 Portland Police Department
 Potterville Police Department
 Quincy Police Department
 Reading Police Department
 Reed City Police Department
 Reese Police Department
Richland Police Department
 Richmond Police Department
 River Rouge Police Department
 Riverview Police Department
 Rochester Police Department
 Rockford Department of Public Safety
 Rockwood Police Department
 Rogers City Police Department
 Romeo Police Department
 Romulus Police Department
 Roosevelt Park Police Department
 Rose City Police Department
 Roseville Police Department
 Rothbury Police Department
 Royal Oak Police Department
 Saginaw Police Department
 Saline Police Department
 Sandusky Police Department
 Sault Ste Marie Police Department
 Schoolcraft Police Department
 Scottville Police Department
 Shelby Police Department
 Shepherd Police Department
 South Haven Police Department
 South Lyon Police Department
 South Rockwood Police Department
 Southfield Police Department
 Southgate Police Department
 Sparta Police Department
 St. Charles Police Department
 St. Clair City Police Department
 St. Clair Shores Police Department
 St. Ignace Police Department
 St. Johns Police Department
 St. Joseph Department of Public Safety
 St. Louis Police Department
Stanton Police Department
 Sterling Heights Police Department
 Stockbridge Police Department
 Sturgis Police Department
 Sylvan Lake Police Department 
 Tawas City Police Department
 Taylor Police Department
Tecumseh Police Department
 Three Oaks Police Department
 Three Rivers Police Department
 Traverse City Police Department
 Trenton Police Department
 Troy Police Department
 Ubly Police Department
 Union City Police Department
Unionville Police Department
 Utica Police Department
 Vassar Police Department
 Vernon Police Department
 Vicksburg Police Department
 Walker Police Department
Walkerville Police Department
 Walled Lake Police Department
 Warren Police Department
 Watervliet Police Department
 Wayland Police Department
 Wayne Police Department
 West Branch Police Department
 Westland Police Department
 White Cloud Police Department
 White Pigeon Police Department
 Whitehall Police Department
 Williamston Police Department
 Wixom Police Department
 Wolverine Lake Village Police Department
 Woodhaven Police Department
 Wyandotte Police Department
 Wyoming Police Department
 Yale Police Department
 Ypsilanti Police Department
 Zeeland Police Department
Zilwaukee Police Department

Township agencies 

Adrian Township Police Department
Argentine Township Police Department
 Baroda-Lake Township Police Department
 Barry Township Police Department
 Bath Township Police Department
 Benton Township Police Department
 Blackman-Leoni Township Department of Public Safety
 Bloomfield Township Police Department
Bridgeport Township Police Department
 Brownstown Township Police Department
Buena Vista Township Police Department
Cambridge Township Police Department
 Canton Township Department of Public Safety
Carrollton Township Police Department
 Chesterfield Township Police Department
 Chikaming Township Police Department
 Chocolay Township Police Department
 Clay Township Police Department
Clayton Township Police Department
 Clinton Township Police Department
 Coloma Township Police Department
 Columbia Township Police Department
Covert Township Police Department
Davison Township Police Department
Denton Township Police Department
DeWitt Township Police Department
Dryden Township Police Department
 Emmett Township Department of Public Safety
Erie Township Police Department
Fairhaven Township Police Department
 Flint Township Police Department
 Flushing Township Police Department
 Forsyth Township Police Department
Fruitport Township Police Department
Garfield Township Police Department
Genesee Township Police Department
Gerrish Township Police Department
 Grand Blanc Township Police Department
 Green Oak Charter Township Police Department
Grosse Ile Township Police Department
 Hamburg Township Police Department
Hampton Township Department of Public Safety
 Home Township Police Department
Huron Township Police Department

Indianfields Township Police Department
 Ishpeming Township Police Department
 Kalamazoo Township Police Department
Kinross Township Police Department
 Lansing Township Police Department
Lapeer Township Police Department
Lincoln Township Police Department
Madison Township Police Department
Marenisco Township Police Department
Meridian Township Police Department
Metamora Township Police Department
Montrose Township Police Department
Mount Morris Towsnhip Police Department
Muskegon Township Police Department
Napoleon Township Police Department
 Northfield Township Police Department
 Northville Township Department of Public Safety
Ontwa Township-Edwardsburg Police Department
 Oscoda Township Police Department
 Pittsfield Township Department of Public Safety
 Plymouth Township Police Department
 Prairieville Township Police Department
 Raisin Township Department of Public Safety
 Redford Township Police Department
Richfield Township Department of Public Safety (Roscommon County)
Richfield Township Police Department (Genesee County)
 Saginaw Township Police Department
 Shelby Township Police Department
 Silver Creek Township Police Department
Somerset Township Police Department
 Spring Arbor Township Police Department
Springport Township Police Department
St. Joseph Township Police Department
 Sumpter Township Police Department
Thomas Township Police Department
Tittabawassee Township Police Department
Tuscarora Township Police Department
 Unadilla Township Police Department
 Van Buren Township Department of Public Safety
 Waterford Township Police Department
 Watersmeet Township Police Department
 West Bloomfield Township Police Department
 White Lake Township Police Department
 Woodland Township Police Department

College and university agencies 
 Central Michigan University Police Department
Delta Community College Department of Public Safety
 Eastern Michigan University Police Department 
 Ferris State University Department of Public Safety
 Grand Rapids Community College Police
 Grand Valley State University Department of Public Safety
Kalamazoo Valley Community College Department of Public Safety
Kellogg Community College Department of Public Safety
Kirtland Community College Department of Public Safety
 Lansing Community College Police Department
Macomb Community College Police Department
 Michigan State University Police Department
 Michigan Technological University Department of Public Safety
Mott Community College Department of Public Safety
 Northern Michigan University Police Department
 Oakland Community College Department of Public Safety
 Oakland University Police Department
 Saginaw Valley State University Police
Schoolcraft College Police Department
University of Michigan-Dearborn Department of Public Safety
  University of Michigan Department of Public Safety
University of Michigan-Flint Department of Public Safety
Wayne County Community College Police Authority
 Wayne State University Department of Public Safety
 Western Michigan University Police Department

Park & School Police Departments
 Detroit Public Schools Community District Police Department
 Huron-Clinton Metropolitan Authority
 Metro Police Authority of Genesee County

Transit Agencies

 Detroit Transit Police Department

Airport Police Agencies 
 Bishop International Airport Authority
 Capital Region Airport Authority Police Department
 Gerald R. Ford International Airport Police 
Wayne County Airport Authority Department of Public Safety

Railroad police departments
 Adrian-Blissfield Railroad Police
 Amtrak Police
 Canadian National Railroad Police
 Canadian Pacific Railroad Police Department
 CSX Transportation Railroad Police Department
 Norfolk Southern Railroad Police

Tribal agencies 

 Bay Mills Tribal Police Department
 Grand Traverse Band Tribal Police Department
 Gun Lake Tribe Department of Public Safety
 Hannahville Tribal Police
 Huron Potawatomi Police Department
 Keweenaw Bay Tribal Police Department
 Lac Vieux Desert Tribal Police Department
 Little River Band of Ottawa Indians Department of Public Safety
 Pokagon Tribal Police
 Saginaw Chippewa Tribal Police Department
 Sault Ste. Marie Tribe Police Department

Defunct agencies
Algonac Police Department
Cedar Springs Police Department
Clarkston Police Department
Coloma Police Department
Coopersville City Police
 Galesburg Police Department
Howard Township Police Department
Middleville Police Department
Niles Township Police Department
Parchment Police Department
 Pontiac Police Department 
Ross Township Police Department 
Sand Lake Police Department 
Sodus Township Police Department
Spring Lake Village Police (Later Spring Lake / Ferrysburg Police)
Spring Lake / Ferrysburg Police Department 
Sunfield Township Police Department 
Vermontville Police Department
Weesaw Township Police Department

See also 
 Crime in Michigan

References

Michigan
Law enforcement agencies of Michigan
Law enforcement agencies